Stanton is an English toponymic surname (habitational surname).

Etymology and history
The name Stanton is derived from Old English term stan ‘stone’ and tun ‘enclosure’ or ‘settlement’.  Many places took on the name Stanton, like Stanton Harcourt in Oxfordshire, and Stanton Drew in Somerset, close to the Neolithic Stanton Drew stone circles. 

Many variants of the spellings, Stanton, Stainton, Stinton or  Staunton, are recorded in the Domesday Book of 1086 AD, and the surname can be found in England, Scotland, Ireland and their diaspora, which includes America.

Notable people with Stanton surname
Notable people with the surname include:
Andrew Stanton (born 1965), animated film director and producer
Andy Stanton (born 1973), British children's author (Mr Gum)
Barry Stanton (musician) (born 1941), Australian rock and roll singer
Brandon Stanton (born 1984), American blogger, photographer, Founder Humans of New York (2010)
Brent Stanton (born 1986), Australian rules footballer
Charles Stanton (1873–1946), Independent Labour Party United Kingdom MP
Charles E. Stanton (1858–1933) United States Army officer
Charles H. Stanton (1838–1913), American farmer and politician
Christine Stanton (born 1959), Australian high jumper
Drew Stanton (born 1984), American football player
Edwin M. Stanton (1814–1869), US Secretary of War during Civil War
Elizabeth Cady Stanton (1815–1902), 19th-century women's rights leader
Elizabeth Stanton (television host) (born 1995), American television host
Eric Stanton (1926–1999), US graphic artist
Frank Stanton (executive) (1908–2006), CBS TV executive
Frank Stanton (rugby league) (born 1940), rugby league footballer and coach
Frank Lebby Stanton (1857–1927), American lyricist
Frederick Perry Stanton (1814–1894), American politician in the 19th century
Frederick Stanton (aviator) (1895–1979), World War I flying ace
Giancarlo Stanton (born 1989), Major League Baseball player for the New York Yankees
Greg Stanton (born 1970), Mayor of Phoenix, Arizona
Harry Dean Stanton (1926–2017), American actor
Henry Stanton (Oz), character in the HBO drama Oz
Henry Stanton (soldier) (c. 1796 – 1856), U.S. brevet brigadier general
Henry Brewster Stanton (1805–1887), anti-slavery activist
Henry Throop Stanton (1834–1899), American poet
John Aloysius Stanton (1857–1929), American painter, educator
Johnny Stanton (born 1994), American football player
Karen Stanton, British historian and academic 
Kathy Stanton, Irish Republican
Martin Walter Stanton (1897–1977), American Catholic bishop
Mike Stanton (left-handed pitcher) (born 1967), Major League Baseball player, member of the 1998–2000 World Champion New York Yankees
Mike Stanton (right-handed pitcher) (born 1952), former Major League Baseball pitcher
Molly Stanton (born 1980), American actress
Noel Stanton (1926–2009), founder of the Jesus Army
Pat Stanton (born 1944), Scottish association football player
Phoebe Stanton (1914–2003) American architectural historian, urban planner, and professor.
Philip Stanton (born 1962), American artist and author based in Barcelona, Spain.
Reverend Father Stanton (1880–1937), Canadian football coach and missionary
Richard Henry Stanton (1812–1891), Congressman from Kentucky
Robert Brewster Stanton (1846–1922), United States civil and mining engineer
Robert L. Stanton (1810–1885), Presbyterian minister and academic administrator
Sam Stanton, Scottish footballer
Stephen Stanton, American voice actor
Susan Stanton (born 1959), city manager of Largo, Florida
Thomas Stanton (1616?–1677), early settler of Hartford, Connecticut and co-founder of Stonington, Connecticut
Thomas Stanton (Medal of Honor) (1869–1950), United States Navy sailor and recipient of the Medal of Honor
Sir Thomas Ernest Stanton (1865-1931), British engineer
Tom Stanton (footballer) (born 1948), Scottish footballer
Will Stanton (actor) (1885–1969), American character actor

References

English-language surnames
English toponymic surnames
Surnames of English origin
Surnames of Old English origin